Marina Kiehl (born 12 January 1965) is a former World Cup alpine ski racer from Germany.

Career
Competing for West Germany in the 1980s, Kiehl gained her first World Cup victory in a Super-G competition in March 1984 in Quebec. She won season titles in Giant slalom In 1985 and in Super-G in 1986. The major highlight in Kiehl's career came at the 1988 Olympics in Calgary, when she won a gold medal in the downhill, ahead of Brigitte Oertli and Karen Percy.

Kiehl retired from competitions after the Calgary Olympics, aged 23.

World Cup results

Season titles

Season standings

Race victories
 7 wins – (6 SG, 1 GS)
 18 podiums – (2 DH, 9 SG, 4 GS, 3 K)

World Championship results

Olympic results

References

External links
 
 

1965 births
Living people
Skiers from Munich
German female alpine skiers
Olympic gold medalists for West Germany
Alpine skiers at the 1984 Winter Olympics
Alpine skiers at the 1988 Winter Olympics
Olympic medalists in alpine skiing
FIS Alpine Ski World Cup champions
Medalists at the 1988 Winter Olympics
Olympic alpine skiers of West Germany